The 2018 Alabama gubernatorial election took place on November 6, 2018, to elect the governor of Alabama.  Incumbent Republican Governor Kay Ivey, who took office on April 10, 2017, upon the resignation of Governor Robert Bentley, ran for election to a full term and won over Tuscaloosa mayor Walt Maddox. Ivey was sworn into office on January 14, 2019.

Republican primary

Candidates

Declared
 Tommy Battle, Mayor of Huntsville
 Scott Dawson, evangelist
 Bill Hightower, State Senator
 Kay Ivey, incumbent governor
 Michael McAllister, former prison officer (died April 2018)

Withdrew
 Slade Blackwell, state senator
 David Carrington, Jefferson County Commissioner
 Twinkle Cavanaugh, president of the Public Service Commission (running for Lieutenant Governor)
 Stacy Lee George, former Morgan County Commissioner and candidate for governor in 2014
 Josh Jones, businessman
 John McMillan, Alabama Commissioner of Agriculture and Industries (running for state treasurer)

Declined
 Rick Burgess, radio host
 Bill "Bubba" Bussey, radio host
 Bradley Byrne, U.S. Representative and candidate for governor in 2010 (running for reelection)
 Mary Scott Hunter, member of the Alabama State Board of Education (running for the state senate after initially running for Lieutenant Governor)
 Del Marsh, President Pro Tempore of the Alabama Senate (running for reelection)
 Arthur Orr, state senator (running for reelection)
 Trip Pittman, state senator and candidate for the U.S. Senate in 2017
 Greg Reed, Majority Leader of the Alabama Senate (running for reelection)
 Luther Strange, former U.S. Senator and former attorney general of Alabama
 Tommy Tuberville, former Auburn University football coach
 Cam Ward, state senator (running for reelection)
 Jim Zeigler, State Auditor of Alabama (running for reelection)

Endorsements

Polling

Results

Democratic primary

Candidates

Declared
 Sue Bell Cobb, former Chief Justice of the Alabama Supreme Court
 Christopher A. Countryman, equality activist, former juvenile corrections officer and former pastor
 James C. Fields, former state representative and nominee for lieutenant governor in 2014
 Walt Maddox, Mayor of Tuscaloosa
 Doug "New Blue" Smith, nominee for Alabama Commissioner of Agriculture and Industries in 2014
 Anthony White, ordained minister

Withdrew
 Jason Childs, truck driver and former pastor

Declined
 Doug Jones, U.S. Senator
 Terri Sewell, U.S. Representative for Alabama's 7th Congressional District

Endorsements

Results

Independents

Candidates

Declared
 Tony Hewitt Jr., police officer
 Eric Lathan, security guard, Iraq War veteran and candidate for the Jefferson County Commission in 2010

Declined
 Mark Johnston, pastor, businessman and summer camp executive director

General election

Predictions

Endorsements

Polling

Results

Counties that flipped from Republican to Democratic
Tuscaloosa County (largest city: Tuscaloosa)
Jefferson County (largest city: Birmingham)

Counties that flipped from Democratic to Republican
Barbour County (largest city: Eufaula)

Maddox narrowly carried Tuscaloosa County, where he currently serves as mayor of Tuscaloosa, by a mere 1 vote. This is the first gubernatorial election since 2002 in which a Democrat won the county and the first since 1990 in which neighboring Pickens County voted for a different candidate than Tuscaloosa.
This is the first time the Republican gubernatorial candidate carried Barbour county since 1872 during Reconstruction.

See also
2018 Alabama elections

Notes

References

External links
Candidates at Vote Smart
Candidates at Ballotpedia

Official gubernatorial campaign websites
Tony Hewitt, Jr. (I) for Governor
Kay Ivey (R) for Governor
Walt Maddox (D) for Governor
Chad "Chig" Martin (I) for Governor

Gubernatorial
2018
Alabama